Dipendra Singh Airee (born 24 January 2000) is a Nepalese cricketer. In August 2018, he was one of the eleven cricketers to play in Nepal's first ever One Day International (ODI) match, against the Netherlands.

Career
He made his List A debut for Nepal against Kenya in the 2015–17 ICC World Cricket League Championship on 11 March 2017. Prior to his List A debut, he was named in Nepal's squad for the 2016 Under-19 Cricket World Cup. In 2017 ACC Under-19 Asia Cup, he was captain of the Nepal national under-19 cricket team. He scored 88 runs and took 4/39 against India in the group A match and was adjudged man of the match. He scored 88 runs to push the total score to 185/8. India were 91/1 after which he led the attack forcing a collapse to 166 all out. India U-19 team were the defending champions and the victory was considered an upset by cricket critics.

In January 2018, he was named in Nepal's squad for the 2018 ICC World Cricket League Division Two tournament.

In July 2018, he was named in Nepal's squad for their One Day International (ODI) series against the Netherlands. These were Nepal's first ODI matches since gaining ODI status during the 2018 Cricket World Cup Qualifier.

He made his Twenty20 International (T20I) on 29 July 2018 in the 2018 MCC Tri-Nation Series, against the Netherlands. He made his ODI debut for Nepal against the Netherlands on 1 August 2018.

In August 2018, he was named in Nepal's squad for the 2018 Asia Cup Qualifier tournament. In October 2018, he was named in Nepal's squad in the Eastern sub-region group for the 2018–19 ICC World Twenty20 Asia Qualifier tournament. In June 2019, he was named in Nepal's squad for the Regional Finals of the 2018–19 ICC T20 World Cup Asia Qualifier tournament.

He made his first-class debut on 6 November 2019, for Nepal against the Marylebone Cricket Club (MCC), during the MCC's tour of Nepal. Later the same month, he was named as the vice-captain of Nepal's squad for the 2019 ACC Emerging Teams Asia Cup in Bangladesh. He was also named in Nepal's squad for the cricket tournament at the 2019 South Asian Games. The Nepal team won the bronze medal, after they beat the Maldives by five wickets in the third-place playoff match. In September 2020, he was one of eighteen cricketers to be awarded with a central contract by the Cricket Association of Nepal.

In December 2021, Airee along with Gyanendra Malla were sacked as vice-captain and captain respectively, over disciplinary issues, with the Cricket Association of Nepal (CAN) appointing Sandeep Lamichhane as the new national captain.

On 26 March 2022, in the second match of a two-match series against Papua New Guinea, Airee scored his first century in an ODI match with 105 runs. On 2 April 2022, in the final round-robin match of the tri-series, Airee scored his first century in T20I cricket, with 110 not out against Malaysia.

References

External links
 

2000 births
Living people
Nepalese cricketers
Nepal One Day International cricketers
Nepal Twenty20 International cricketers
South Asian Games bronze medalists for Nepal
South Asian Games medalists in cricket